PRF may refer to:

Science and technology
 Physical register file, in CPU design
 Platelet rich fibrin
 Pontine reticular formation
 Positive-real function in mathematics
 Programmed ribosomal frameshifting during mRNA translation
 Pseudorandom function family
 Pulse repetition frequency

Organizations
 Polícia Rodoviária Federal, the Federal Highway Police of Brazil
 Progeria Research Foundation

Business
 Pasture, rangeland, and forage insurance, a type of crop insurance for livestock growers

Other uses
 Perfect (grammar), a tense